Wiren is a surname. Notable people with the surname include:
Andy Wiren (1911–1998), New Zealand cricketer.
Dag Wiren (1905-1986), Swedish composer.
Gary Wiren (born 1935), PGA Master Professional instructor.
Nyle Wiren (born 1973), American football defensive lineman.

See also
 Wiren (film), a Surinamese film